Trace was a Dutch progressive rock trio founded by Rick van der Linden in 1974 after leaving Ekseption. The band was formed in 1971 and released its debut album, "Trace," in 1974. The band's music was characterized by complex arrangements and intricate instrumental work, and their compositions often featured a mix of rock, jazz, and classical influences. Trace released a total of three albums during their career. Trace was fairly popular in Europe, and they gained a loyal following among fans of progressive rock. However, they never achieved widespread commercial success and disbanded in the late 1970s, merging back into Ekseption. Despite this, the band's music has continued to be appreciated by fans of progressive rock.

History 
In 1973, after releasing their album entitled Trinity, the other members of Ekseption asked Rick van der Linden to leave the band. At this time Ekseption were quite famous which led Philips, their record-company, to give van der Linden the opportunity to find a new band.

In January 1974 van der Linden started rehearsals with Peter de Leeuwe, who had previously played drums with Ekseption.  The pair split up again soon after, since van der Linden considered de Leeuwe to be lacking in skill. De Leeuwe was replaced in February by Pierre van der Linden (a second-cousin of Rick), who had left Focus in October, 1973.  To complete the trio, Rick asked Jaap van Eik, a self-taught musician considered to be one of the best Dutch bass players, to join the band.  Originally named Ace (in the tradition of Cream and Flash to highlight their supergroup status), they had to change the name to Trace when they discovered a British band had already trademarked the name.

In May 1974 the trio recorded their first single, a prog rock version of Dizzy Gillespie's Tabu, backed by an original theme, Progress, which saw release in July 1974.  On 9 September 1974 the group released its eponymous, first album.  Their second album Birds was released on 1 January 1975, and featured future Marillion drummer Ian Mosley.  A third album, The White Ladies, was released in 1976 with Rick van der Linden being supported by all of the former members of Ekseption except trumpeter Rein van den Broek.  In 1978 van den Broek rejoined the group, which became Ekseption once again.

Discography

Trace (1974)
Personnel:
 Rick van der Linden - keyboards
 Jaap van Eik - guitars
 Pierre van der Linden - drums

Birds (1975)
Personnel:
 Rick van der Linden - keyboards
 Jaap van Eik - guitars, vocals
 Ian Mosley - drums
 Darryl Way - violins
 Coen Hoedeman - assorted monkeys

All tracks written & arranged by Rick van der Linden except as noted

The White Ladies (1976)
Personnel:
 Rick van der Linden - keyboards
 Cor Dekker - bass guitar
 Peter de Leeuwe - drums, guitars
 Dick Remelink - saxes, flute
 Hans Jacobse - keyboards
 Hetty Smit - vocals
 Harry Schäfer - narrator
 The Benny Behr Strings conducted by Job Maarse

References

Dutch progressive rock groups
Dutch musical trios